Dmitry Vadimovich Sablin (Дми́трий Вади́мович Са́блин; born September 5, 1968) is a Ukrainian-born Russian politician, who has served as a Member of the State Duma since 2016, having previously held the office between 2003 and 2013. Sablin served a Senator from Moscow Oblast from 2013 to 2016. He is a member of the ruling United Russia party and represents New Moscow. 

Outside of parliament, he is the First Deputy Chair of the Fighting Fraternity (Boyevoye bratstvo) veterans organisations.

Education 
 Moscow Higher All-Arms Command School named after Supreme Soviet of the RSFSR (1989);
 Military Academy of the General Staff of the Russian Federation Armed Forces (courses, 2008, 2015);
 Moscow State University of Service (Russian State University of Tourism and Service) (2003).

Political career

In parliament 
Sablin is head of the State Duma group that oversees ties between Russian and Syrian lawmakers.

Activism in Ukraine 
Beginning in January 2015, Sablin was involved in the creation of an Anti-Maidan Russian nationalist movement.

Personal life 
Sablin is married to  Alla Sablina (née Nalcha), who is the General Director of Rota Real Estate.

Dmitry Sablin co-owns several Rota Group assets, including Rota-Krym, which owns property in the annexed region of Crimea. According to Dozhd, Sablin is one of the wealthiest members of the State Duma.

References

External links 

1968 births
Living people
Politicians from Mariupol
United Russia politicians
Fourth convocation members of the State Duma (Russian Federation)
Fifth convocation members of the State Duma (Russian Federation)
Sixth convocation members of the State Duma (Russian Federation)
Seventh convocation members of the State Duma (Russian Federation)
Eighth convocation members of the State Duma (Russian Federation)
Members of the Federation Council of Russia (after 2000)